Chiara Corbelletto (born 1956) is an Italian-New Zealand sculptor.

Life 
She was born in  Biella, Italy. She graduated from Modigliani Art School, and University of Milan. She lives in Auckland.

Installations 

 Twins, 2003 
 Numbers are the language of nature , 2005 
 White Delta, 2008 
 Caleidofiore, 2009

Exhibitions 

 1997 TeTuhi 
 2011 Suter Art Gallery 
 2019 SCAPE Public Art

References

External links 

 Chiara Corbelletto Outdoor Art of New Zealand
 Chiara Corbelletto Good Form

1956 births
Living people
New Zealand women sculptors
University of Milan alumni
People from Biella